Leventis (Λεβέντης) is a Greek word for describing a brave man, derived from the Greek name for the Levant. Because nt is pronounced /nd/ in Greek, the name is sometimes spelled Levendis.  The etymology of Leventis is given in the Oxford Dictionary of American Family Names:

Alternatively, it may originate from the Turkish word Levend.

Contemporary Meaning
In contemporary Greek, "levendis" means a handsome and gallant male.

People

Here is a partial list of people named Leventis or Levendis:

Anastasios George Leventis (1902-1978), Greek-Cypriot businessman and dominant figure in the economy of many West African countries and especially Nigeria. Held the title of Babalaje of Egbaland.
Andrew G. Leventis (born 1980), American painter and professor
Phil P. Leventis (born 1945), American politician
Vassilis Leventis (born 1951), Greek politician
George Levendis, TV and music industry executive

In Harlan Ellison's short story The Man Who Rowed Christopher Columbus Ashore, each of the vignettes that comprise the story are preceded by "LEVENDIS":

Sports
The Nigerian football team Leventis United is named after the A. G. Leventis foundation created by Anastasios G. Leventis.

Greek-language surnames
Surnames